The 2022 Omloop Het Nieuwsblad is a road cycling one-day race that took place on 26 February 2022 in Belgium, starting in Gent and finishing in Ninove. It was the 77th edition of the Omloop Het Nieuwsblad and the second event of the 2022 UCI World Tour.

Omloop Het Nieuwsblad is a race that is usually won by a solo rider or is decided by a sprint from a small group of several riders. This year was no exception, winner Wout van Aert attacked with 13 km to go from the group of favorites. Victor Campenaerts was the first to try chase Van Aert down from the group of 20 riders. van Aert held his lead to the line extending the gap to 22 seconds. The group of 20 sprint out for the rest of the places of the podium with Sonny Colbrelli beating Greg Van Avermaet.

Teams 
Twenty-five teams participated in the race, including all eighteen UCI WorldTour teams and seven UCI ProTeams.

Result

References

External links
 

2022 UCI World Tour
2022
Omloop Het Nieuwsblad
Omloop Het Nieuwsblad